This article lists the governors of the governorates of Italian East Africa. The governorates formed the first level of country subdivision of the Italian East Africa, a colony of the Italian Empire from 1936 to 1941.

List

Addis Ababa / Scioa Governorate

|-style="text-align:center;"
!colspan=6|Addis Ababa Governorate
|-

|-style="text-align:center;"
!colspan=6|Scioa Governorate
|-

Amhara Governorate

Eritrea Governorate

Galla-Sidamo Governorate

Harar Governorate

Somalia Governorate

Notes

See also

Italian East Africa
List of governors-general of Italian East Africa
Italian Ethiopia
Italian Eritrea
List of colonial governors of Italian Eritrea
Italian Somaliland
List of colonial governors of Italian Somaliland
History of Ethiopia
History of Eritrea
History of Somalia
Second Italo-Ethiopian War
East African campaign (World War II)
Arbegnoch
Italian guerrilla war in Ethiopia

References

External links
Worldstatesmen.org – Ethiopia (Italian East Africa), Eritrea and Somalia

 

Governorates Of Italian East Africa

Italian Empire-related lists
Ethiopia history-related lists
Eritrea history-related lists
Somalia history-related lists